Croft is an unincorporated community in Pratt County, Kansas, United States.  It is located southwest of Pratt.

History
Long ago, it had a rail station on the Wichita & Englewood division of the Atchison, Topeka & Santa Fe railroad. It had telephone connections, local trade, did some shipping and in 1910, reported a population of 30.  A post office was opened in Croft in 1907, and remained in operation until it was discontinued in 1961.

References

Further reading

External links
 Pratt County maps: Current, Historic, KDOT

Unincorporated communities in Pratt County, Kansas
Unincorporated communities in Kansas